Operation FOOT was the expulsion of 105 Soviet officials from Great Britain carried out by Prime Minister of the United Kingdom Edward Heath in September 1971 as part of the Cold War. It is "[t]he largest expulsion of intelligence officials by any government in history." It "was a British response to the general Soviet plan to advance terrorist activities in the West."

Though Britain had engaged in "tit-for-tat" expulsions previously, the expulsion of 105 diplomats was "unprecedented" and "sent shock waves through not just the Kremlin, but through the international community as a whole."

The operation "marked the major turning point in Cold War counter-espionage operations in Britain" and "made Britain a hard espionage target for Soviet intelligence for the first time."

References

External links
 ‘Giving the Russians a Bloody Nose’: Operation Foot and Soviet Espionage in the United Kingdom, 1964–71 Cold War History (Taylor Francis)

Cold War history of the United Kingdom